Attitudes was a rock band from Los Angeles consisting of keyboardist David Foster, guitarist Danny Kortchmar, bassist Paul Stallworth and drummer Jim Keltner. Its band members came together while working as session musicians on George Harrison's album Extra Texture (Read All About It). They then recorded for Harrison's Dark Horse record label. The band's 1976 single "Sweet Summer Music" reached number 94 on the Billboard Hot 100. James Taylor's recording of their single "Honey Don't Leave L.A." peaked at number 61 on the Billboard Hot 100 in 1978.

Band members
 David Foster – keyboards
 Jim Keltner – drums, percussion
 Danny (Kootch) Kortchmar – guitar, lead and background vocals
 Paul Stallworth – bass, lead and background vocals

Discography

Albums
 1976: Attitudes (UK AMLH 22008) (USA SP22008) (Japan KING GP-289)
 1977: Good News (UK K 56385) (USA DH 3021) (Japan WARNER P-10386D)

Singles
 1975: "Ain't Love Enough" / "The Whole World's Crazy" (UK AMS 5504) (USA DH 10004)
 1976: "Honey Don't Leave L.A." / "Lend a Hand" (USA DH 10008)
 1976: "Sweet Summer Music" / "If We Want To" (UK AMS 5508) (USA DH 10011)
 1977: "Sweet Summer Music" / "Being Here with You" (USA DRC 8404)
 1977: "In a Stranger's Arms" / "Good News" (USA DRC 8452)

Album details

Attitudes
All songs produced by Lee Kiefer and Attitudes.

Track listing
Side 1
 "Ain't Love Enough" (David Foster, Brenda Gordon Russell, Brian Russell)
 "Street Scene" (Danny Kortchmar)
 "A Moment" (Foster, Jim Keltner, Kortchmar, Paul Stallworth)
 "You and I Are So in Love" (B.J. Cook, Eric Mercury)
 "Squank" (Foster, Keltner, Kortchmar, Stallworth)

Side 2
"Lend a Hand" (Stallworth)
 "Chump Change Romeo" (Kortchmar)
 "First Ballad" (Foster, Keltner, Kortchmar, Stallworth)
 "Honey Don't Leave L.A." (Kortchmar)
 "In the Flow of Love" (Gilbert Bottiglier, Chuck Higgins Jr., Stallworth)

Personnel
Additional musicians
Jesse Ed Davis – guitar
Chuck Higgins – vocals
Vince Charles – percussion, timbales
Vanette Cloud – background vocals
Cosmo DeAguero – conductor, congas 
Lee Kiefer – producer, engineer
Pat Murphy – conductor
Carmen Twillie – vocals, background vocals
Fabio Nicoli – art direction
Kathryn Collier – background vocals

Good News
Produced by Jay Lewis and Attitudes.

Track listing
Side 1
 "Being Here with You" (Foster, Keltner, Kortchmar, Stallworth)
 "Drink My Water" (B. G. Russell, B. Russell)
 "Sweet Summer Music" (Bottiglier, Higgins Jr., Stallworth)
 "Let's Talk Turkey" (Kortchmar)
 "Foster's Frees" (Foster)
 "Turning in Space" (Brown, Higgins Jr., Stallworth)

Side 2
"Change" (Stallworth)
 "In a Stranger's Arms" (Kortchmar)
 "Manual Dexterity" (Kortchmar)
 "Promise Me the Moon" (Kortchmar)
 "Good News" (Stallworth)

Personnel
Additional musicians
Ringo Starr – drums (on "Good News")
Tower of Power – horns
Jorge Calderón – lead and background vocals
Chuck Higgins – lead vocals
George Bell – flute 
Marvin Braxton – harmonica
Vince Charles – percussion, timbales 
Donny Gerrard – lead and background vocals
Jay Graydon – guitar 
Jimmie Haskell – string arrangements
Booker T. Jones – organ, keyboards
Jay Lewis – guitar 
Pat Murphy – percussion, conductor, conga
Keith Olsen – engineer 
Yvonne Rankin – lead and background vocals
Emil Richards – percussion
Waddy Wachtel – guitar 
Greg Adams – horn arrangements

References

Rock music groups from California
Dark Horse Records artists